The Redfield Carnegie Library in Redfield, South Dakota is a building from 1902. It was listed on the National Register of Historic Places in 1978.

It is a one-story building with a red brick facing above an ashlar-faced foundation.  It has a portico with pilasters and paired Doric columns supporting a pediment.

The library was funded by a $10,000 Carnegie library grant.

References

External links
 Redfield Carnegie Library - Redfield, SD

Libraries on the National Register of Historic Places in South Dakota
Romanesque Revival architecture in South Dakota
Library buildings completed in 1902
Carnegie libraries in South Dakota
Buildings and structures in Spink County, South Dakota
Public libraries in South Dakota
Education in Spink County, South Dakota
National Register of Historic Places in Spink County, South Dakota